The Manchester Evening Chronicle Tournament was a professional golf tournament played at Mere Golf Club in Mere, Cheshire, England. It was held from 1947 to 1949. The event was sponsored by the Manchester Evening Chronicle. Total prize money was £1400 in 1947 and £1500 in 1948 and 1949.

Winners

References

Golf tournaments in England